Nyakach is an electoral constituency in Kenya. It is one of seven constituencies of Kisumu County. The constituency has five wards, all electing MCAs for the Kisumu County Assembly.

The constituency was established for the 1966  elections, when it was split from the Nyando Constituency. It was one of three constituencies of the former Nyando District.

Members of Parliament 

2022 ||Joshua Aduma Owuor||ODM ||
|}[2027 Kenyan general election |2027] ] | |  Stephen Onyango Obiero  || Orange Democratic Movement | ODM] ||

County Assembly wards

References

External links 

Constituencies in Kisumu County
Constituencies in Nyanza Province
1966 establishments in Kenya
Constituencies established in 1966